Ontario Health (OH) is a Crown agency of the Government of Ontario that was established on June 6, 2019. Described as a "super agency", Ontario Health will oversee much of the administration of the Ontario healthcare system, with the eventual goal of integrating services split between various agencies.

Background 
Introduced by the Progressive Conservative (PC) government of Premier Doug Ford, as the Health Program Initiatives, the agency's mandate is defined in the Connecting Care Act, 2019 and The People's Health Care Act, 2019.

The agency is to absorb and administer several components of the Ontario healthcare system, including:

 Cancer Care Ontario
 eHealth Ontario
 Trillium Gift of Life Network
 Health Quality Ontario
 HealthForceOntario
 Ontario Telemedicine Network (OTN) 
 Health Shared Services Ontario
 the 14 Local Health Integration Networks (LHINs)

Services such as human resources and communications will be centralized into the new agency.

Health Minister Christine Elliott, who oversaw the introduction of the agency, described it as a "health system of the future" which "will see fewer patients treated in hospital hallways, more seniors get care in their homes, less bumpy discharges from hospital and fewer unnecessary trips to emergency departments."

Financial impact 
The province expects to save $350 million a year by 2021–22, but University of Ottawa professor Doug Angus cautioned that a similar approach was introduced in Alberta, which has the highest per capita healthcare spending in the country. The New Democratic Party also raised concerns, with Member of Provincial Parliament (MPP) France Gelinas noting that "In British Columbia and in Alberta, health centralization wasted billions of dollars".

Health care spending was heavily debated during the Ontario 2018 election, with Ford's Conservatives committing to end "hallway health care". However, the introduction of the Ontario Health agency has also been criticized in the National Post by Randall Denley—a former provincial Conservative politician who ran in 2011 and 2014—as wasting "time, money and energy on reshaping the health bureaucracy" rather than "specific solutions to well-identified problems."

Ontario Health Teams 
The agency will introduce 50 to 70 Ontario Health Teams (OHTs), which would connect groups of healthcare services in "clusters" so that a patient could access services and replace much of the role that the existing 14 local health integration networks play.

Role 
OHTs are voluntary collaborations between health services providers. In their applications for designation as OHT’s, the potential teams must describe how they will integrate services for a regional population and how they will ensure “warm handovers” for patients making transitions in the system.

Criticism 
The introduction of OHTs has been criticized for lack of direction from the Ministry of Health, making it unclear the role they will play in delivering or standardizing services. Critics say the government has been overly vague in defining a role for OHTs and question the effectiveness of overseeing over 50 different OHTs, saying it will be overly complex compared to the previous system of 14 LHINs, as well as eliminating their regional focus. Bob Bell, a former physician and University Health Network CEO who served as deputy health minister, who claims that "Given the lack of clear direction coming from the ministry, OHTs seem at risk of creating a fragmented, chaotic approach to provincial health service planning", specifically questioning the effect they will have on home-care services, which were previously standardized under the LHIN system, stating: "work done in developing a standard provincial foundation for homecare will be lost".

Governance

Transparency concerns 
The government was criticized for the lack of consultation when introducing the Ontario Health agency.

Concerns were raised regarding the agency's board meetings, which were initially held with no advance notice or invitation to the public. While open meetings were a legislative requirement for local health integration networks, no such legislation compels Ontario Health to hold open meetings.

See also 

 Ministry of Health (Ontario)
 Ministry of Long-term Care
 Healthcare in Canada
 Ontario Health Insurance Plan (OHIP)

References

External links 

 Ontario government health webpage

Medical and health organizations based in Ontario
Ontario government departments and agencies